Steven Williford is an American television director. He was nominated for seven Daytime Emmy Awards in the category Outstanding Drama Series Directing Team for his work on the television programs All My Children, Days of Our Lives and The Young and the Restless. Williford served as the director for his only film credit The Green.

References

External links 

Living people
Place of birth missing (living people)
Year of birth missing (living people)
American television directors
American soap opera directors